Lajos Bertus (born 26 September 1990) is a Hungarian football player who plays for Diósgyőr.

Club statistics

Updated to games played as of 15 May 2021.

References 
Player Profile at Kecskemeti TE Official Website
HLSZ
MLSZ

1990 births
Living people
People from Kecskemét
Hungarian footballers
Hungary under-21 international footballers
Association football midfielders
Kecskeméti TE players
Puskás Akadémia FC players
Paksi FC players
Mezőkövesdi SE footballers
Diósgyőri VTK players
Nemzeti Bajnokság I players
Nemzeti Bajnokság II players
Sportspeople from Bács-Kiskun County
21st-century Hungarian people